The 2022 Meretz leadership election was held on 23 August 2022 in the leadup to the 2022 Israeli legislative election. On 12 July, incumbent Nitzan Horowitz announced that he would not seek re-election as leader. Former party leader Zehava Gal-On defeated former deputy Chief of the General Staff Yair Golan.

Background
In June 2019, incumbent leader of Meretz Tamar Zandberg was defeated by Nitzan Horowitz in a vote held by the party's conference ahead of a legislative election in September. Following his election, Horowitz formed an alliance with the Israel Democratic Party and the Green Party, named the Democratic Union. The alliance won five seats in the election. In the 2020 election, Meretz ran in a joint list with the Israeli Labor Party and Gesher, which won seven seats. In December 2020, Yair Golan, who previously led the Israel Democratic Party, announced that he would join Meretz. Meretz ran alone in the 2021 election, where it won six seats, and subsequently participated the thirty-sixth government, the first time Meretz sat in a government since 2001.

Criticism of incumbent party leader Nitzan Horowitz's leadership included a failure to keep the party's Knesset members in line, which was blamed for playing a factor in the breakdown of the governing coalition. After an early Knesset election was called, polls showed Meretz polling near (and often below) the electoral threshold. Despite the interest of leadership within Meretz to run on a joint list with the Israeli Labor Party in the coming election, that party's leader, Merav Michaeli, had dismissed the possibility of this.

On 12 July 2022, Horowitz announced he would not seek re-election as party leader, but would remain in politics. On 18 July, following speculation regarding a potential candidacy, former leader of Meretz Zehava Gal-On stated that she would "Announce when there is something to announce", neither confirming nor denying reports that she was considering a run. The next day, Gal-On announced she would run for the leadership of Meretz.

Candidates

Ran
Yair Golan, member of the Knesset since 2020, deputy economy minister, former deputy chief of the General Staff of the Israel Defense Forces
Zehava Gal-On, former party leader (2012–2018) and former member of the Knesset

Withdrew
The following individual withdrew from the election:

Nitzan Horowitz, party leader since 2019 and health minister

Did not run
The following individual was speculated as a potential candidate, but did not run:

Tamar Zandberg,  former party leader (2018–2019) and minister of environmental protection since 2021

Campaign
On 6 July 2022, Yair Galon announced his candidacy for Meretz leadership, setting up a contested leadership vote. On 12 July 2022, incumbent leader Horowitz withdrew from seeking reelection as party leader. While former party leader Zehava Gal-On had originally dismissed the possibility of a run at the time that Yair Galon entered the race, calls for her to run continued. On 19 July, Gal-On announced her candidacy.

Against Gal-On, who had already served as party leader, Golan cast himself as leading the party towards the future rather than the past.

Results

References 

August 2022 events in Asia
Meretz leadership elections
2022 political party leadership elections
Meretz leadership